The 1963 Wichita Shockers football team was an American football team that represented Wichita  University (now known as Wichita State University) as a member of the Missouri Valley Conference during the 1963 NCAA University Division football season. In its second season under head coach Marcelino Huerta, the team compiled a 7–2 record (3–1 against conference opponents), won the MVC championship, and outscored opponents by a total of 233 to 117. The team played its home games at Veterans Field, now known as Cessna Stadium. Pro Football Hall of Fame coach Bill Parcells was a senior linebacker on the team.

Schedule

References

Wichita
Wichita State Shockers football seasons
Missouri Valley Conference football champion seasons
Wichita Shockers football